Drago Vuković (born 3 August 1983), is a former Croatian handball player. He is Olympic champion from 2004 with the Croatian national team, and he received a silver medal at the 2008 and 2010 European championships, and bronze medals at the 2012 Olympics, the 2013 World Championships and 2012 European Championships. He is the twin brother of the football player, the goalkeeper of RNK Split, Andrija Vuković.

After his club Gummersbach failed to retain Handball-Bundesliga position, Vuković decided to retire.

Honours
Zagreb
Croatian First League (4): 2002-03, 2003–04, 2004–05, 2005-06
Handball Cup (4): 2003, 2004, 2005, 2006

Gummersbach
EHF Cup (1): 2009
EHF Cup Winner's Cup (2): 2010, 2011

Berlin
IHF Super Globe (1): 2016
EHF Cup: 2017-18

References

External links
 Statistics

1983 births
Living people
Sportspeople from Split, Croatia
Croatian male handball players
Olympic handball players of Croatia
Handball players at the 2004 Summer Olympics
Handball players at the 2008 Summer Olympics
Handball players at the 2012 Summer Olympics
Olympic gold medalists for Croatia
Olympic bronze medalists for Croatia
Olympic medalists in handball
RK Zagreb players
Croatian twins
Twin sportspeople
Medalists at the 2012 Summer Olympics
Medalists at the 2004 Summer Olympics
Mediterranean Games silver medalists for Croatia
Competitors at the 2005 Mediterranean Games
Mediterranean Games medalists in handball